Taractrocera ina, the ina grassdart or no-brand grass-dart, is a butterfly of the family Hesperiidae. It is found in northern, central and eastern Australia in scattered localities, south to western New South Wales and Papua New Guinea.

The wingspan is about 20 mm.

The larvae feed on Cymbopogon citrata, Paspalum urvillei, Urochloa decumbens, Sorghum verticilliflorum, Paspalum conjugatum, Panicum maximum and Oryza sativa. It constructs a tubular shelter made of the leaves of its host plant.

External links
Australian Insects
Australian Faunal Directory
Phylogeny and biogeography of the genus Taractrocera Butler, 1870 (Lepidoptera: Hesperiidae), an example of Southeast Asian-Australian interchange

Taractrocerini
Butterflies described in 1933